CAV High School, also known as Chandulal Anglo-Vedic High School, is a high school located in Hisar city of Haryana, India. It is the oldest school in Hisar still in operation. It is run and funded by DAV College Managing Committee. In 2004–05, committee started another wing with the name of CAV Senior Secondary School for class XI and XII.

Under the same committee, there is another private public school is also running named D N Model School and recently they have started CAV Primary School.

Description 
The school was started on 1 April 1918, by members of Arya Samaj in Hisar. It was named after Lala Chandulal Tayal. Donations came from Seth Chhaju Ram and Lala Lajpat Rai and land was donated by Harilal Tayal, younger brother of Chandulal Tayal. The school is affiliated to Haryana Board of School Education. The school is a Privately Funded Public School run by the not-for-profit trust Dayanand Anglo-Vedic Schools System.

Notable alumni 
 Subhash Chandra - Rajya Sabha member (2016–present) and founder chairman of Zee TV and Essel Group

Gallery

See also 

 List of schools in Hisar
 List of universities and colleges in Hisar
 List of institutions of higher education in Haryana

References 

Schools in Hisar (city)
High schools and secondary schools in Haryana
Universities and colleges affiliated with the Arya Samaj